Susanne Lothar (15 November 1960 – 21 July 2012) was a German film, television and stage actress.

Early life and education
Susanne Lothar was born on 15 November 1960 in Hamburg, Germany. She was the daughter of actors Hanns Lothar and Ingrid Andree, who divorced in 1965, the year before her father's death. She studied drama at the Hochschule für Theater und Musik (School of Theatre and Music) in Hamburg.

Career
Lothar was a member of the company of the Deutsches Schauspielhaus theatre in Hamburg for many years and her performances include roles in Frank Wedekind's Lulu plays (Erdgeist (Earth Spirit) and Die Büchse der Pandora (Pandora's Box)), produced by Peter Zadek. For her first film Eisenhans (Strange Fruits, 1983), she received the prize for best young actress at the German Film Awards. With Ulrich Mühe, she appeared as the victimised married couple in the original version of Michael Haneke's Funny Games released in 1997. Lothar worked again with Haneke in The Castle (which also featured Mühe, 1997), as Mrs Schober in The Piano Teacher (2001), and The White Ribbon (2009).

Personal life and death
Lothar married actor Ulrich Mühe in 1997; the couple had two children. Mühe died from cancer in 2007.

Susanne Lothar's death was announced in a written statement by lawyer Christian Schertz, representing her family, on 25 July 2012. Though the cause of death was not publicly disclosed, Michael Haneke confirmed that she committed suicide in a special feature on the Criterion Collection release of Funny Games.  Lothar died just a day before the fifth anniversary of her husband's death.

Filmography

  (1983)
  (1990, TV film)
 The Mountain (1991)
 The Democratic Terrorist (1992)
 Benito (The Rise and Fall of Benito Mussolini, 1993, TV miniseries)
 Funny Games (1997)
 The Castle (1997, TV film)
  (2000, TV film)
 The Piano Teacher (2001)
 Snowland (2005)
 Under the Ice (2006)
 Madonnas (2007)
 The Reader (2008)
  (2008)
 The White Ribbon (2009)
 Nemesis (2010)
 Murder on the Orient Express (2010, TV film)
 The Coming Days (2010)
 If Not Us, Who? (2011)
 Remembrance (2011)
 Dust on Our Hearts (2012)
 Anna Karenina (2012)

References

External links
 
 "Das erste Mal – Frau Lothar, wann sind Sie Sie selbst?", NZZFolio
 
 Traueranzeige (deutsch)

1960 births
2012 deaths
Actresses from Hamburg
Best Actress German Film Award winners
German film actresses
German stage actresses
German television actresses
Hochschule für Musik und Theater Hamburg alumni
20th-century German actresses
21st-century German actresses
2012 suicides
Suicides in Germany